Jon Wassink (born February 4, 1997) is a former American football quarterback who played college football at Western Michigan.

High school career 
Wassink attended South Christian High School in Byron Center, Michigan where he played basketball and football. As a football player, he played quarterback, defensive back, punter, and kicker. As a high school senior, he led his team to a MHSAA Division 4 state title, throwing for 179 yards and three touchdowns, rushing for another 122 and a touchdown, while also kicking two extra points and scoring a two-point conversion. Ranked a three-star recruit, his recruitment was considered somewhat unusual as he opted to spend more time with family rather than attend camps or recruiting trips. He committed to play football at Western Michigan at the end of his junior year and signed his letter of intent in February 2015.

College career

2015 season 
Wassink did not see any game action in 2015 and was subsequently redshirted.

2016 season 
As a redshirt freshman, Wassink did not see any game action but ran the scout team as Western Michigan rolled to a 13–1 record and a MAC championship.

2017 season 
Entering the season with a new head coach, Wassink was named the starting quarterback for the season opener against ranked opponent USC. He threw for 67 yards and a touchdown while also rushing for another touchdown in a 49–31 loss. He played in seven more games before suffering a broken collarbone against Eastern Michigan and missing the remainder of the season.

2018 season 
Wassink once again entered the 2018 season as the Broncos starting quarterback. After starting the first seven games of the season, he was added to the Manning Award watchlist after racking up 1,929 passing yards and 16 touchdowns. This achievement was short-lived as he suffered an injury to his right foot against Toledo and missed the remainder of the season once again. He earned his bachelor's in accountancy from Western Michigan in spring 2018.

2019 season 
Aiming to play a full season, Wassink led the Broncos to a 7–5 record and an invite to the First Responder Bowl. He threw for 193 yards with a touchdown and an interception, but the Broncos ultimately lost to Western Kentucky on a last second field goal 23–20.

At the end of the season, Wassink was named the recipient of the Wuerffel Trophy, given to the college football player "who best combines exemplary community service with athletic and academic achievement." He was also named to the All-MAC team as a member of the third-team offense.

After initially training for the 2020 NFL Draft, Wassink elected not to pursue a professional football career, citing the lack of interest from agents and no pro day due to the COVID-19 pandemic.

College statistics

Personal life 
Wassink married Ally Smith in January 2020.

References

External links 
 Jon Wassink on Twitter
 Western Michigan bio

1997 births
Living people
Players of American football from Grand Rapids, Michigan
American football quarterbacks
Western Michigan Broncos football players